Longipenis is a genus of moths in the family Lecithoceridae.

Species
Longipenis deltidius Wu, 1994
Longipenis dentivalvus H. Wang and M. Wang, 2010
Longipenis paradeltidius M. Wang and Xiong, 2010

References

Lecithoceridae